Ankyrin repeat domain-containing protein 23 is a protein that in humans is encoded by the ANKRD23 gene.

This gene is a member of the muscle ankyrin repeat protein (MARP) family and encodes a protein with four tandem ankyrin-like repeats. The protein is localized to the nucleus, functioning as a transcriptional regulator. Expression of this protein is induced during recovery following starvation.

Interactions
ANKRD23 has been shown to interact with Titin and MYPN.

References

External links

Further reading